Tanachai Noorach (born March 18, 1992) is a Thai professional footballer who plays as a goalkeeper for Thai League 1 club Nakhon Ratchasima.

References

External links
 
 

1992 births
Living people
Tanachai Noorach
Tanachai Noorach
Association football goalkeepers
Tanachai Noorach
Tanachai Noorach
Tanachai Noorach
Tanachai Noorach
Tanachai Noorach
Tanachai Noorach
Tanachai Noorach